Monotropa hypopitys, the so-called Dutchman's pipe, false beech-drops, pinesap, or yellow bird's-nest, is a herbaceous perennial plant, formerly classified in the families Monotropaceae or Pyrolaceae, but now included within the subfamily Monotropoideae of the family Ericaceae. It is native to temperate regions of the Northern Hemisphere, and is scarce or rare in many areas. However, it is still the most widespread member of the subfamily. While currently included in the genus Monotropa, recent genetic evidence strongly suggests that Monotropa hypopitys should be placed in its own genus, Hypopitys, with the single species Hypopitys monotropa Crantz, but possibly containing several other species.

Unlike most plants, it does not contain chlorophyll; it is a myco-heterotroph, getting its food through parasitism upon fungi rather than photosynthesis. These fungi form a mycorrhiza with nearby tree species.

Plants are fleshy and grow 10–35 cm tall. True stems are nonexistent.  Instead, the only part which emerges from the soil are unbranched, adventitious inflorescences developmentally similar to adventitious roots. All parts of the plant are pale yellowish white to reddish-tinged. The bracts are 5–10 mm long scale-like structures, which cover most of the inflorescence. Plants flower from April to December depending on the geographic region (May to October in North America).  The flowers are pendulous when young, but become erect when they begin to mature into the fruit which is a capsule. The flowers are 9–12 mm long and produced in a cluster of 1–11 together at the apex of the inflorescence, which is a raceme. It flowers between early summer and mid autumn; plants that flower in summer are yellow and sparsely hairy, while those that flower in autumn are red and densely hairy. These two color "forms" overlap in flowering time. It has been suggested that yellow individuals are largely self-pollinating.

The species name is from Latinized Greek hypo-, "under", and pitys, "pine", referring to where pinesap often grows.  However, Linnaeus misspelled it hypopithys.  Many authorities have followed his spelling.  On the other hand, it has been stated that the spelling "is generally treated as correctable to 'hypopitys'", as followed by other authorities. The variability of the species in colour, hairiness, and in the number of flowers, has led to an extensive synonymy for the species. The entire list is over 80 synonyms; some of which include Hypopitys americana, H. fimbriata, H. insignata, H. lanuginosa, H. latisquama, H. monotropa, Monotropa chinensis, M. hypophegea, M. lanuginosa, M. latisquama, M. multiflora and M. taiwaniana.

In California, Monotropa hypopitys may be confused for the much less common Pityopus or Hemitomes which are superficially similar.

References

External links

 Monotropa hypopitys

Monotropoideae
Parasitic plants
Flora of Europe
Flora of Asia
Flora of North America
Plants described in 1753
Taxa named by Carl Linnaeus